is the second studio album by Yoko Kanno, with vocals by frequent collaborator Maaya Sakamoto. It was released on May 22, 2002. It is the soundtrack for the NHK radio drama adaptation of the book The Other Side of Midnight.

Track listing

Contributors
Piano & Keyboards: Yoko Kanno
Bass: Hitoshi Watanabe
Drums Yasuo Sano
Guitar: Tsuneo Imahori, Hisaaki Hogari
Percussion: Masaharu Sato
Trumpet: Shiro Sasaki
Trombone: Satoshi Sano
Saxophone: Shoji Haruna
Strings: Masatsugu Shinozaki group
Synthesizer manipulating: Keishi Utara, Syunsuke Sakamoto 
Vocals: Maaya Sakamoto, Masaharu Sato, Gabriela Robin, Hisaaki Hogari
Special thanks: Tim & Mayu Jensen, Hayashi-san, Saeko Nishimura

External links
23-Ji no Ongaku at Kanno Yoko Network

2002 albums
Albums produced by Yoko Kanno
Victor Entertainment albums